Shell Cove is a seaside suburb in the  Shellharbour area located just south of Wollongong, New South Wales, Australia. Shell Cove adjoins Bass Point and Killalea State Park and includes a variety of facilities and amenities such as: parks and bush reserves, The Links Golf Course, Shell Cove Public School & pre-schools, Shellharbour Anglican College, Family Health Medical Centre and of course The newly developed Shell Cove Marina.

Heritage listings
Shell Cove has a number of heritage-listed sites, including:
 Boollwarroo Parade: Bass Point Reserve

Shell Cove Marina 
The recent addition of the Shell Cove Marina has been welcomed by many in the local community. There are a few different restaurants and cafes, a barber, Woolworths, Bakery, Gelato store and a few retail stores. There is also a Kids Beach that offers a nice space for parents to sit and watch their kids. There are many apartments that have a direct view into the marina. For people who enjoy gardening, there is a Community Garden who meet on Wednesdays and Saturdays. The Shell Cove Marina is a remarkable 30% bigger than Darling Harbour, measuring an area of more than 10 hectares.

Butterflies 
Shell Cove is home to some great butterflies. The excellent ecological value of this area (largely due to Killalea Reserve and Bass Point State Reserve) means that butterflies can flourish.

Some species that have been recorded in the area by a local lepidopterist are:

-The Orchard Swallowtail

-The Dainty Swallowtail

-The Blue Triangle

-The Black Jezebel

-The Cabbage White

-The Meadow Argus

-The Australian Painted Lady

-The Yellow Admiral

-The Monarch

-The Lesser Wanderer

-Grass Darts

-Ochres

-The Bright Copper

-Grass Blues

-The Plumbago Blue

And even butterflies that rarely come to Shell Cove like:

-The Varied Eggfly

-The Common Crow

-The Spotted Jezebel

-The Blue Tiger

-The Macleay's Swallowtail

References
3. https://www.frasersproperty.com.au/NSW/Shell-Cove/Life-at/Shellharbour-Marina

4.https://www.frasersproperty.com.au/NSW/Shell-Cove/Life-at/Shellharbour-Marina#:~:text=Did%20you%20know%3F,30%25%20larger%20than%20Darling%20Harbour.

Suburbs of Wollongong
City of Shellharbour